The Swedish Union of Professional Musicians ( - SYMF) is a trade union that organises professional singers and musicians. The union emerged as a split from the Swedish Musicians' Union (SMF) in the mid-1980s to solely represent musicians with employment contracts (as opposed to freelance musicians). SYMF and SMF jointly negotiate a national collective agreement with the Swedish employers' group, Swedish Performing Arts, which covers wages, insurance, copyright and pensions.

References

Trade unions in Sweden
Trade unions established in 1984
Swedish Confederation of Professional Employees
Musicians' trade unions